Metro Diner is an American casual dining restaurant chain headquartered in Tampa, Florida. It has 58 locations throughout the United States and was featured in an episode of Diners, Drive-Ins and Dives in 2010.

History

Metro Diner has roots back to 1938 when the first diner was opened in Jacksonville, Florida. It was not officially branded as Metro Diner until 1992 and was purchased by brothers Mark and John Davoli (Jr.) in 2000. Their father joined them a few years later and expanded to several locations in the Jacksonville area, including Mandarin, Ortega, and Jacksonville Beach. In 2010, Metro Diner was featured in an episode of Diners, Drive-Ins and Dives.

ConSul Hospitality Group, made up of Chris Sullivan and Hugh Connerty, partnered with the Davoli family in 2014 to help expand the chain. At that time, the chain had nine locations. By 2018, Metro Diner opened its 50th restaurant and by 2020 had 58 locations throughout the United States.

Menu

Its menu is classic American diner food. It is known for items such as chicken and waffles and meatloaf and serves breakfast, lunch, and dinner. It also has a location known as Metro Diner Express for contactless ordering and payment, developed in response to the COVID-19 pandemic in the United States in 2020.

References

External links
 Official website

1992 establishments in Florida
Restaurant chains in the United States
Restaurants established in 1992
Companies based in Tampa, Florida